Thicketty Mountain is a mountain summit in northwestern Cherokee County in the state of South Carolina. Thicketty Mountain is also one of the three mountain peaks of Cherokee County.

External links 
 Thicketty Mountain Summit - South Carolina Mountain Peak Information

Mountains of South Carolina
Landforms of Cherokee County, South Carolina
Inselbergs of Piedmont (United States)